Jan Zimmermann (born 5 October 1979) is a German football manager and former player who is currently in charge of Borussia Dortmund II.

Playing career
Zimmermann was a youth product of Bayer Leverkusen. He spent his playing career at Arminia Hannover, TSV Havelse, Borussia Mönchengladbach II, Carl Zeiss Jena, Eintracht Braunschweig, VfB Lübeck, SC Verl, 1. FC Wunstorf and Germania Egestorf/Langreder.

Managerial career

Germania Egestorf/Langreder
Zimmermann started his managerial career in 2011 at Germania Egestorf/Langreder as a player-manager. In his seven years as manager, he led the club from the sixth-tier Landesliga Hannover to the fourth-tier Regionalliga Nord. The club managed to qualify for the 2016–17 DFB-Pokal, losing 0–6 against 1899 Hoffenheim in the first round.

TSV Havelse
In 2018, Zimmermann was hired as the manager of TSV Havelse. During his tenure, Havelse won the 2019–20 Lower Saxony Cup, earning qualification to the 2020–21 DFB-Pokal, where Havelse lost 1–5 in the first round against Bundesliga club Mainz 05. In the abandoned 2020–21 Regionalliga Nord season, Havelse was ranked third and earned qualification to the promotion play-offs after Weiche Flensburg and Werder Bremen II did not apply for 3. Liga licenses.

Hannover 96
On 10 May 2021, Zimmermann was announced as manager of Hannover 96 starting from the 2021–22 season. He was sacked on 29 November 2021.

Borussia Dortmund II
On 8 February 2023, Zimmerman was announced as manager of Borussia Dortmund II, signing a contract until June 2024; he replaced the sacked Christian Preußer.

Managerial statistics

Honours

Player
Germania Egestorf/Langreder
 Landesliga Hannover: 2011–12

Managerial
Germania Egestorf/Langreder
 Landesliga Hannover: 2011–12
 Lower Saxony Cup runner-up: 2015–16

TSV Havelse
 Lower Saxony Cup: 2019–20

References

External links

1979 births
Living people
German footballers
Association football forwards
SV Arminia Hannover players
TSV Havelse players
Borussia Mönchengladbach II players
FC Carl Zeiss Jena players
Eintracht Braunschweig players
VfB Lübeck players
SC Verl players
1. FC Germania Egestorf/Langreder players
German football managers
TSV Havelse managers
Borussia Dortmund II managers
Hannover 96 managers
2. Bundesliga managers
3. Liga managers
Footballers from Hanover